Louise Moillon (1610–1696) was a French still life painter in the Baroque era. It is recorded that she became known as one of the best still life painters of her time, as her work was purchased by King Charles I of England, as well as French nobility. Louise Moillon is also known for her Flemish style that is present in her artwork. Moillon created about 40 artworks during her lifetime which are held in museums and private collections.

Life
Moillon was born into a strict Calvinist family in Paris in 1610. She grew up in St–Germain-des-Prés district of Paris, a district known as a safe haven for religiously persecuted Protestant refugees primarily from the southern Netherlands. This district was also known for its collection of traditional Netherlandish painters who could have attributed to the development of Moillon's painting style.  Louise lived during the Baroque era of painting:  a time where still-life painting was beginning to grow and thrive. However, still-life paintings especially thrived in the art market in Holland, and did not control the art market in France where Moillon resided. Louise Moillon had six siblings, one of whom was also a painter named Isaac Moillon, who obtained his education from the French Royal Academy of Painting and Sculpture. Her father, Nicolas Moillon, was a landscape and portrait painter, art dealer, and member of the Académie de Saint-Luc. Moillon's mother, Marie Gilbert, was a daughter of a goldsmith. Moillon learned the basics of painting from her father, however he died when she was young. The following year, Moillon's mother remarried another painter and art dealer, Francois Garnier. Garnier continued to give Moillon lessons and expanded her art education although it is thought other people were instrumental in Moillon's art education.

Louise Moillon married a timber merchant, Etienne Girardot, in the 1640s and did not paint as frequently after her marriage. She did not have any children of her own.  The Revocation Edict of Nantes in 1685 discriminated on any religion other than Catholicism, forcing citizens of France to convert to Catholicism and Louise's family was greatly affected. It is thought Moillon's husband was sent to prison after he refused to convert to Catholicism. After the revocation, no records of Louise producing work have been found. Louise died in France in 1696 and was given a Catholic burial.

Painting style 
Louise Moillon specialized in still-life painting, commonly using oil paint on canvas or wood panel. She also made works primarily containing fruits that were usually arranged on tables.  Her work is characterized by stillness and acute detail, such as the texture of exotic fruit glowingly displayed against a dark background. She used Trompe l’oeil elements to give viewers an illusion and make her paintings realistic. Louise Moillon used Trompe l'oeil to give her still-lifes a lot of texture which further contribute to the realistic aspects and make her paintings relatable to pictures. Moillon additionally created ledges in her pieces that spread to the end of the picture frame to enhance the illusion. Although Moillon painted still-lifes, human figures sometimes appeared in the background of her pieces. Moillon was one of the first French still-life artists to combine figures and still-life before 1650 along with another painter named Jacques Linard. Moillon's style used elements from Flemish painting through use of Trompe l'oeil elements and the contrast of cool and warm toned colors along with aspects of French genre painting as shown through the compositional style of her paintings. Some of Louise Moillon's painting compositions have been described to have a primitive quality due to the way she arranges the fruit. The notion that Louise Moillon was highly regarded by her contemporaries is demonstrated by the writing of Georges de Scudéry (1646) who placed her name alongside the still-life painters Jacques Linard and Peter van Boucle (Pieter van Boeckel), comparing all three to Michelangelo, Raphael, and Titian. In 1641, she collaborated with Boucle and Linard on a large composition of fruit and flowers. The majority of Moillon's paintings were executed in the 1630s, before her marriage in 1640 to Etienne Girardot de   Chancourt. Her last dated work is from 1674.

Gallery of works

References

External links

1609 births
1696 deaths
French Baroque painters
French women painters
17th-century French women artists